TV Nacional do Brasil (TV NBR) was a government owned television channel in Brazil.

History
NBR's first transmission was on June 16, 1997, during the government of President Fernando Henrique Cardoso, Brazil National TV initially or just NBR. Despite being educational, the station broadcast live all acts, ceremonies and inaugurations of FHC and gained several affiliates, generating controversy for unlawful use of mass media for election campaign, which occurred in the same year.

During Jair Bolsonaro's government, the station was shut down and its channels now simulcast TV Brasil programming.

References

Television networks in Brazil
Defunct television channels in Brazil
Portuguese-language television stations in Brazil
Television channels and stations established in 1997
1997 establishments in Brazil
Empresa Brasil de Comunicação